Stavros Gavriel (born 29 January 2002) is a Cypriot professional footballer who plays as a winger for Cypriot First Division club APOEL.

Club career
Gavriel made his professional debut for APOEL in the Cypriot First Division on 25 November 2020, in a 2–0 home win over Doxa. he scored his first goal for APOEL in a 1–0 win against E.N.P scoring the only goal of the game.

References

External links
 
 Stavros Gavriel at APOEL FC

2002 births
Living people
Cypriot footballers
Association football defenders
Cypriot First Division players
APOEL FC players
Cyprus youth international footballers